Dejan Djokić may refer to:

Dejan Djokić (historian), Serbian historian
Dejan Djokic (footballer) (born 2000), Swiss footballer
Dejan Đokić (basketball) (born 1989), Serbian basketball player